Carmichaelia exsul is a flowering plant in the legume family. It is the only species of the genus Carmichaelia found in Australia. The specific epithet means an exile, with reference to it being the only species in its genus native outside New Zealand.

Description
It is a broom-like shrub, growing to 1–3 m in height. The adult shoots are leafless, ridged, flattened, drooping and spreading. The flowers are white with purple markings, sweetly scented and produced in racemose inflorescences. The pale orange, kidney-shaped seeds are 3 mm long.

Distribution and habitat
The plant is endemic to Australia’s subtropical Lord Howe Island in the Tasman Sea. It is a rare inhabitant of rock ledges in the island's southern mountains at elevations of over 400 m. The species is listed as endangered in New South Wales.

References

exsul
Endemic flora of Lord Howe Island
Fabales of Australia
Plants described in 1871
Taxa named by Ferdinand von Mueller